The Odisha Construction Corporation or OCC is a premier Government of Odisha undertaking. Established in the year 1962 under the then Indian National Congress government of Biju Patnaik(fourth Chief Minister of Odisha) to undertake specialised civil and mechanical construction works hence creating an infrastructure base in the state of Odisha. The Odisha Construction Corporation is headed by the Principal Secretary to Government, Water Resources as ex-officio Chairman.

The Odisha Construction Corporation is well equipped with machinery, equipment and vehicle to handle construction works and gives construction services for Hydro Electric Projects, Irrigation Projects, Thermal Power Projects, Industrial Projects Industrial Buildings, Bridges, Harbors, Railways and Building Projects.

Completed Projects

Hydroelectric Projects
 Concrete, Masonry & Earth Dams, Tunnels, Spillways, Power House, Hydraulic Gates, Steel Penstock of Balimela, Upper Kolab, Rengali & Upper Indravati Projects

Irrigation Projects
 Barrages, Canals & Hydraulic Structure of Mahanadi Barrage, Samal Barrage, Naraj Barrage & Harbhangi Irrigation Projects

Thermal Power Projects
 Power Plants, Water Treatment Plant & Cooling Towers of Talcher Thermal, IB Thermal & STPP (NTPC)

Industrial Projects
 Industrial Building & Heavy Fabricated Structure of National Aluminium Company (NALCO), Hindustan Aeronautics Limited (HAL), Rourkela Steel Plant (RSP) & Neelachal Ispat Nigam Limited (NINL).

Bridges
 Balasore Fly Over, Express Highway & Kandal Bridge

Harbors
 Breakwater & Berths of Paradip Port Trust

Railway Projects
Tunnel, Fabricated Steel Bridge & Embankment of Koraput-Rayagada Railway Project

Buildings
 Residential, Office, School & Hospital Buildings & Cyclone Shelters.

Roads
 PMGSY Roads of RD Department

Ongoing Projects
 Lower Indra Spillway, Canals & Gate Works
 Titilagarh Spillway & Gate works
 Manjore Spillway & Gate works
 Kanupur Spillway & Gate works
 Telengiri Irrigation (Spillway & Earth Dam)
 Sagada Aqueduct of UIIP
 Rengali Right Bank Canal
 Baghalati Spillway, Dam and Gate works.
 Subarnarekha Canal Work
 Anandapur Barrage Gate works
 PMGSY Road Works
 Lower Suktel Spillway
 Ret Spillway
 Puri Town Water Supply & Drainage Work

References

External links
Official Website of Odisha Construction Corporation (OCC)

Economy of Odisha
State agencies of Odisha
Construction and civil engineering companies of India
Construction and civil engineering companies established in 1962
Indian companies established in 1962
1962 establishments in Orissa